Events in the year 1956 in Spain.

Incumbents
Caudillo: Francisco Franco

Births
 April 5 - El Risitas, comedian and actor (died 2021)
September 30 - Magda Camps, Olympic swimmer.
November 13 - Miguel Lang, Olympic swimmer.

Deaths

March 30 - Luis Bayón Herrera, film director and screenwriter (b. 1889)
October 5 - Juan Armet, football player ad coach (b. 1895).

See also
 List of Spanish films of 1956

References

 
Years of the 20th century in Spain
1950s in Spain
Spain
Spain